Va'aiga Lealuga Tuigamala Pulelua Fesola'i  (4 September 1969 – 24 February 2022), sometimes known as Inga Tuigamala, was a professional rugby union and rugby league footballer. Born in Samoa, he represented New Zealand in rugby union, winning 19 caps, and later Samoa in both rugby league (two caps) and rugby union (23 caps). He played in one rugby league and two rugby union World Cups.

Tuigamala began his career in rugby union, and played provincially for Auckland. He changed rugby football codes from rugby union to rugby league, and became an integral part of the successful Wigan team of the 1990. He later returned to union winning championships with London Wasps and Newcastle Falcons.

A centre or wing, he was known as a powerful runner, much larger than most wings in rugby union.

Early life 

Born in Faleasiu, Samoa, Tuigamala and his family moved to New Zealand when he was 4 years old. He grew up in southern Glendene in West Auckland, New Zealand.

Playing career

Rugby union
He played in New Zealand for Ponsonby and Auckland. He represented New Zealand (the All Blacks) in rugby union as a winger from 1989, playing his first test match against the US in 1991. At the time, Tuigamala was the first person born in Samoa to play for the All Blacks. He won 19 caps, including playing at the 1991 World Cup.

Nicknamed Inga the Winger, he converted to rugby league, signing with English club Wigan in 1993. His biography Inga the Winger by Bob Howitt was also published in 1993.

Rugby league
In rugby league, Tuigamala markedly improved his fitness and played as a centre in a very strong and successful Wigan team, winning several trophies over four seasons. Tuigamala played from the interchange bench in Wigan's 1994 World Club Challenge victory over Australian premiers, the Brisbane Broncos, in Brisbane.

He also played international rugby league for Samoa, including at the 1995 World Cup. At the end of 1996's Super League I, Tuigamala was named at centre in the Super League Dream Team.

Return to rugby union
When rugby union became openly professional in 1995, Tuigamala was one of a number of former rugby union players who returned from rugby league. He played for London Wasps, winning the English Premiership, and later joined Newcastle Falcons in a world record £1m deal. He scored a hat-trick on his third appearance for Newcastle against Moseley at Kingston Park and was an important part of the 1998 Championship-winning side, making 16 appearances that season. He then delayed an arm operation to put in a Man of the Match performance in the 2001 Cup Final. Upon signing for the Falcons, teammate Doddie Weir called Tuigamala "simply the best rugby player in the world".

He made his début for Western Samoa in 1996 against Ireland, going on to play 23 test matches, scoring 3 tries. He was an important part of the Samoa squad at the 1999 World Cup.

He was known for his Christian faith, and in particular for the influence he had on Jason Robinson, a teammate at Wigan. Tuigamala shared his Christian faith, though it wasn't until some time later that Robinson became a Christian.

Post-playing
Following the end of his rugby career, he acted as advisor for his cousin David Tua, a professional heavyweight boxer, and ran a funeral director company, "Tuigamala and Sons of Glendene" for which the most notable client to date was the late King of Tonga, Taufa'ahau Tupou IV.

In the 2008 Queen's Birthday Honours, Tuigamala was appointed a Member of the New Zealand Order of Merit, for services to rugby and the community.

In October 2009, he travelled to Samoa with David Tua to see how they could assist in the aftermath of the Samoa tsunami.

On 22 May 2014, he promoted a boxing event at the Logan Campbell Centre in Auckland, New Zealand. The event was broadcast by New Zealand's Sky TV on pay-per-view. In the event, he and his two sons all fought, with all three winning their respective bouts.

Tuigamala died on 24 February 2022, at the age of 52. At the time of his death, he had high blood pressure. He completed season two of Match Fit to regain match fitness after suffering from sleep apnoea and was a type II diabetic, which was reversed by late 2021, and in the second season in 2021/22, he revealed he started adopting a plant-based diet, and had a very healthy blood cholesterol levels. Despite that, he also suffered from gout. By the end on NZ's second COVID-19 lockdown, both he and Brad Mika's knees have recovered enough to bike. He was then able to reverse his diabetes. However, he was forced to leave day 2 of the union vs. league multi-sport relay due to family emergency.

References

External links

 Va'aiga Tuigamala Wigan Career Page on the Wigan RL Fansite.
Wasps profile

1969 births
2022 deaths
Dual-code rugby internationals
Expatriate rugby league players in England
Expatriate rugby union players in England
Members of the New Zealand Order of Merit
New Zealand international rugby union players
New Zealand rugby league players
New Zealand rugby union players
Newcastle Falcons players
New Zealand expatriate rugby union players
New Zealand expatriate sportspeople in England
New Zealand expatriate rugby league players
New Zealand Christians
People from A'ana
Rugby union centres
Samoa international rugby union players
Samoa national rugby league team players
Samoan emigrants to New Zealand
Samoan expatriate rugby league players
Samoan expatriate rugby union players
Samoan expatriate sportspeople in England
Samoan rugby league players
Samoan rugby union players
Wigan Warriors players
Wasps RFC players